Frank "Frankie" LaPorte (October 7, 1901 – October 30, 1972) was an Italian–American racketeer in the Chicago Outfit. He was the Chicago Heights boss during the early 20th century. His closest associates in bootlegging included Ross Prio, Louis Campagna and onetime Outfit boss, Alphonse Capone.

Background and relationship with Outfit boss Al Capone

Historians have little information on LaPorte's early life and background. Even his role in the Chicago Outfit is currently unclear.

However, what is known is that LaPorte was considered a "power broker" in the Outfit and a powerful mobster, who kept a relatively low profile. According to some, LaPorte and other Chicago Heights gangsters held seats on the Commission for bosses. 

According to Laurance Begreen, Al Capone biographer and author of the book Capone: The Man and the Era, Capone was merely a "front boss" for the Outfit, while LaPorte and other Sicilian racketeers managed the Outfit behind the scenes.

References

American crime bosses
Prohibition-era gangsters
Chicago Outfit
Depression-era gangsters
Al Capone associates
People from Chicago Heights, Illinois
American gangsters of Italian descent